Shahar Perkiss (born 14 October 1962) is an Israeli right-handed former professional tennis player. He reached his best singles ranking of world # 53 in March 1985. He peaked at world # 54 in the doubles rankings in November 1985. Perkiss won the silver medal in singles in tennis at the 1989 Maccabiah Games, but won the gold medal in doubles playing alongside Boaz Merenstein.

Early life
Perkiss was born in Haifa, Israel, and is Jewish.

Tennis career

A year after first picking up a tennis racket, Perkiss ranked No.  1 in Israel in the age 10 and under ranks. Perkiss trained at Israel Tennis Centers.

He reached his highest singles ATP ranking on 4 March 1985, when he became the # 53 player in the world.

In 1982 in Houston he reeled off three upsets in a row, beating world No. 27 Ramesh Krishnan, No. 37 Terry Moor, and No. 36 Mark Dickson.  In August 1984 he defeated world No. 9 Aaron Krickstein in straight sets in Cincinnati.  In 1986 he beat world # 10 Thierry Tulasne of France, 6–7, 6–2  6–4, in Kitzbuhel, Austria.  In 1987, he and Gilad Bloom won the ATP doubles title in Tel Aviv.

Davis Cup

He played 31 Davis Cup matches for Israel between 1981 and 1992, winning 18 of them, including 11 of 13 on hard courts.

Olympics

He represented Israel as a qualifier at the 1988 Summer Olympics in Seoul.  There, he was defeated in the first round by Javier Frana from Argentina.

Maccabiah Games
Perkiss won the silver medal in singles in tennis at the 1989 Maccabiah Games, as he lost in the finals to South Africa's Howard Joffe, part of the ROW (Rest of the World) team due to country sanctions, but won the gold medal in doubles playing alongside Boaz Merenstein.

Israel Tennis Association
In 2005, he became the CEO of the Israel Tennis Association.

Career finals

Singles (1 runner-up)

Doubles (1 title)

See also
List of select Jewish tennis players

References

External links
 
 
 

1962 births
Living people
Sportspeople from Haifa
Israeli male tennis players
Tennis players at the 1988 Summer Olympics
Olympic tennis players of Israel
Jewish tennis players
Israeli Jews
University of Haifa alumni
Maccabiah Games medalists in tennis
Maccabiah Games silver medalists for Israel
Competitors at the 1989 Maccabiah Games